St. George by the Grange Anglican Church, formerly known as St. George the Martyr Anglican Church, is an Anglican Church of Canada church in the Grange Park neighbourhood of Toronto, Ontario. The church is currently in a period of "sabbath rest" from public worship.

The present church building was constructed in 1857 as the parish hall and became the place of worship when the main building, built in 1845 and of which only the tower survives, was destroyed by fire in 1955.

History
The church opened as St. George the Martyr Anglican Church on November 9, 1845, on land donated by the Boulton family (who lived in The Grange). It was the third Anglican parish in the city, after St. James's and Trinity. The Gothic Revival style church with 150-foot spire was designed by Henry Bowyer Lane. The parish hall (now the church's place of worship) was constructed in 1857 by Kivas Tully and the rectory was constructed in 1865 by Gundry & Langley.

Around the turn of the 20th century, the demographics of downtown changed, affecting Anglican churches in the area. The parish merged with nearby St. Margaret's, Spadina, in 1909 but continued to worship at St. George's.

The church was destroyed by fire on February 13, 1955. Only the tower survived. The cost of a new church was deemed too expensive, thus, the congregation worshipped in the rectory until, in 1957, the parish hall had been converted into a new place of worship. The footprint of the former church is now a garden. In 1985, a two-story cloister was built encircling the former nave.

In 2018, the church changed its name from St. George the Martyr to St. George by the Grange.

Gallery

See also

 List of Anglican churches in Toronto
 Parkdale Deanery

References

George by the Grange Anglican Church, St.
George by the Grange Anglican Church, St.
George by the Grange Anglican Church, St.
Gothic Revival architecture in Toronto
George by the Grange Anglican Church, St.
George by the Grange Anglican Church, St.